The discography of Drew Seeley, an American recording artist, consists of two studio album, three extended plays, fifteen singles and other album appearances.

Albums

Studio albums

Extended plays

Singles

As main artist

As featured artist

Other charted songs

Other appearances

Music videos

Notes
Notes
A: Seeley sang in several of the songs of High School Musical, his voice being mixed with Zac Efron's, but he originally wasn't given credit for singing.
B: Seeley sang in several of the songs of StarStruck, his voice being mixed with Sterling Knight's, but he originally wasn't given credit for singing.
C: "Dance with Me" did not enter the Billboard Hot 100, but peaked at number 20 on the Bubbling Under Hot 100 Singles chart.
D: "New Classic" did not enter the Billboard Hot 100, but peaked at number 14 on the Bubbling Under Hot 100 Singles chart.

References

Pop music discographies
Discographies of American artists